Wake Up! Music Album with His Words and Prayers is a progressive rock album by Pope Francis released on 27 November 2015 on Believe Digital. The album is formed of speeches by Pope Francis recorded in numerous locations worldwide between 2013 and 2015 with accompanying music tracks of prayers and hymns by various Italian artists and producers.

Production 
Under the art direction of Don Giulio Neroni, who also curated other albums for Popes John Paul II and Benedict XVI, various Italian artists and producers also contributed to the music like Giorgio Kriegsch, Mite Balduzzi, Giuseppe Dati, Lorenzo Piscopo, the orchestral director Dino Doni, and former member of Italian progressive rock band Le Orme Tony Pagliuca. The album was released through the Believe Digital label.

Composition 
The album sets papal prayers and speeches to  pop, rock, and classical music. The lyrics are varyingly Spanish, Portuguese or Italian, although the title track "Wake Up! Go! Go! Forward!" is in English. While most of the music is described by Rolling Stone as "New Age neoclassicism" not unlike the work of Vangelis or Kitaro, "Wake Up! Go! Go! Forward!" is identified as "the most rocking".

Reception 

Tom Maxwell of Al Jazeera America states "Musically, the album is similar to but more animated than what one would hear during a yoga class or massage session" and that "What might be most noteworthy about Wake Up! is how groundbreaking it is. ...  For such a figure [as the pope] to release an album of music at all is scarcely precedented, much less one that incorporates popular musical forms of the last few decades."

Entertainment reporter Chi Chi Izundu on BBC Newsbeat expressed the opinion that some of the album "has the vibe of 80s rock", and another part is "hauntingly beautiful" and that the album is "all in all, a very pleasant listen".

Helen Brown in The Telegraph calls it a "mellow, accessible album" and states "Proceeds go to help refugees at a time when displaced people are struggling to find room at the inn. Whatever your stance on the Catholic Church, or its leader, I suspect Pope Francis has made a good call here. At a time of increasingly inflamed religious emotions, the world could use a little Holy chill out."

Release 
The first track released from the album was "Wake Up! Go! Go! Forward!" on 26 September 2015.

Track listing 
Wake Up! includes the following tracks.

Charts

References

External links
Official Site

2015 debut albums
Contemporary Catholic liturgical music
Pope Francis albums
Spanish-language albums
Latin-language albums
Portuguese-language albums
Progressive rock albums by Italian artists